Patti Austin (born August 10, 1950) is an American R&B, pop, and jazz singer and songwriter.

Music career
Austin was born in Harlem, New York, to Gordon Austin, a jazz trombonist. She was raised in Bay Shore, New York on Long Island. Quincy Jones and Dinah Washington have referred to themselves as her godparents.

When Austin was four years old, she performed at the Apollo Theater. As a teenager she recorded commercial jingles and worked as a session singer in soul and R&B. She had an R&B hit in 1969 with "Family Tree". She sang backing vocals on Paul Simon's 1975 number-one hit "50 Ways to Leave Your Lover". The jazz label CTI released her debut album, End of a Rainbow, in 1976. She sang "The Closer I Get to You" for Tom Browne's album Browne Sugar, a duet with Michael Jackson for his album Off the Wall, and a duet with George Benson on "Moody's Mood for Love".

After singing on Quincy Jones's album The Dude, she signed a contract with his record label, Qwest, which released Every Home Should Have One with "Baby, Come to Me", a duet with James Ingram that became a No. 1 hit on the Billboard magazine pop chart. A second duet with Ingram, "How Do You Keep the Music Playing", appeared on soundtrack to the film Best Friends (1982). Her final album for Qwest, The Real Me contained versions of jazz standards. Austin moved on to  GRP for four releases, including Love Is Gonna Getcha, which contained the singles "Good in Love" and "Through the Test of Time".

Austin was booked for United Flight 93 on September 11, 2001, but because her mother suffered a stroke days before, she cancelled her ticket and flew at a different time.

In 2003, she collaborated with Frances Yip on Papillon III in the rotunda of San Francisco City Hall to help the Jade Ribbon Campaign of Stanford University. A companion CD/DVD was released with Austin and Yip singing duets in Mandarin.

A performance in 2000 with the Germany-based WDR Big Band led to later recordings with the Germany-based ensemble that yielded two of Austin's six Grammy nominations: For Ella (2002) was a tribute to Ella Fitzgerald. A 2007 release with the band and arranger Michael Abene, Avant Gershwin, earned her the trophy for Best Jazz Vocal Performance.

During a 2007 interview, Austin spoke of reluctantly attending as a teenager one of Judy Garland's last concerts and how the experience helped focus her career. "She ripped my heart out. I wanted to interpret a lyric like that, to present who I was at the moment through the lyric."

In 2011, Sound Advice was released containing cover versions of Bob Dylan's "Gotta Serve Somebody", Brenda Russell's "A Little Bit of Love", the Jackson Five's "Give It Up", Bill Withers' "Lean on Me", and Don McLean's "Vincent". The album also included "The Grace of God", a song Austin wrote after watching an episode of the Oprah Winfrey Show which included a woman with scarred face. Austin appeared in the documentary film 20 Feet from Stardom, which premiered at the Sundance Film Festival and was released on 21 June 2013.

In 2015, Austin appeared on Patrick Williams' Home Suite Home large jazz ensemble album, as vocalist for Williams' composition "52nd & Broadway," which won a Grammy for Best Arrangement, Instruments and Vocals.

Awards and honors
 Grammy Award, Best Jazz Vocal Album, Avant Gershwin, 2008
 Honorary doctorate, Berklee College of Music

Discography

Studio albums

Live albums

Singles

Filmography

See also
List of artists who reached number one in the United States
List of artists who reached number one on the U.S. Dance Club Songs chart

References

External links

 Official site
 Patti Austin from the CTI, Qwest and GRP Years at Webstarts

1950 births
Living people
Jazz musicians from New York (state)
People from Bay Shore, New York
People from Harlem
Singers from New York City
20th-century American singers
20th-century American women singers
21st-century American singers
20th-century African-American women singers
American contraltos
American dance musicians
American women jazz singers
American jazz singers
American rhythm and blues singers
Grammy Award winners
GRP Records artists
Qwest Records artists
RCA Victor artists
CTI Records artists
21st-century African-American women singers